Cosmopolis may refer to:

Arts

Film 
 Cosmopolis (film), a 2012 film by David Cronenberg based on the DeLillo novel
 Cosmopolis, a fictional city in the Speed Racer film adaptation

Literature 
 Cosmopolis (novel), a 2003 novel by Don DeLillo
 Cosmopolis, an 1892 novel by Paul Bourget
 Cosmopolis: The Hidden Agenda of Modernity, a book by Stephen Toulmin
 Cosmopolis, the journal of the Jack Vance Integral Edition project.

Music 
 Cosmopolis, a musical work by Elias Breeskin
 Cosmopolis, an album by Polish music band Brygada Kryzys

Television 
 Cosmopolis, the fictional city in which the TV series Mission Hill is set

Other 
 Cosmopolis, a fictional universe-wide magazine employed by novelist Jack Vance
 Cosmopolis lamps are a range of High-intensity discharge lamps produced by Signify N.V. (formerly, Philips Lighting).

Places 
 Cosmopolis, Washington, a city in the United States
 Cosmópolis, a municipality in the state of São Paulo in Brazil

Publications 
 Cosmopolis: An International Monthly Review, a defunct multilingual literary magazine published from 1896 to 1898

Other 
 Cosmopolis XXI, a planned Russian vehicle that is billed as a space tourism vehicle

See also
 Ecumenopolis, a single continuous worldwide city
 Cosmopolitan (disambiguation)